Aladin Šišić (born 28 September 1991) is a Bosnian professional footballer who plays as a midfielder for Bosnian Premier League club Olimpik.

Club career
After spells in Switzerland, Estonia and Slovenia, he joined Bosnian giants FK Sarajevo in summer 2018 on a free from Mladost Doboj Kakanj, but was released after his contract expired after a season. He then joined Olimpik in summer 2020.

Honours
Sarajevo
Bosnian Premier League: 2018–19, 2019–20 
Bosnian Cup: 2018–19

See also
List of FK Sarajevo players

References

External links
PrvaLiga profile 
Aladin Šišić at playmakerstats.com (English version of calciozz.it)

1991 births
Living people
People from Cazin
Association football midfielders
Bosnia and Herzegovina footballers
Bosnia and Herzegovina youth international footballers
FK Krajina Cazin players
JK Tallinna Kalev players
NK Domžale players
FK Mladost Doboj Kakanj players
FK Sarajevo players
FK Olimpik players
Meistriliiga players
Slovenian PrvaLiga players
Premier League of Bosnia and Herzegovina players
Bosnia and Herzegovina expatriate footballers
Expatriate footballers in Switzerland
Bosnia and Herzegovina expatriate sportspeople in Switzerland
Expatriate footballers in Estonia
Bosnia and Herzegovina expatriate sportspeople in Estonia
Expatriate footballers in Slovenia
Bosnia and Herzegovina expatriate sportspeople in Slovenia